The Peace of Callias is a purported peace treaty established around 449 BC between the Delian League (led by Athens) and Persia, ending the Greco-Persian Wars. The peace was agreed as the first compromise treaty between Achaemenid Persia and a Greek city.

The peace was negotiated by Callias, an Athenian politician. Persia had continually lost territory to the Greeks after the end of Xerxes I's invasion in 479 BC. The exact date of the treaty is debated, although it is usually placed after the Battle of the Eurymedon in 469 or 466 or the Battle of Cypriot Salamis in 450. The Peace of Callias gave autonomy to the Ionian states in Asia Minor, prohibited the encroachment of Persian satrapies within three days march of the Aegean coast, and prohibited Persian ships from the Aegean. Athens also agreed not to interfere with Persia's possessions in Asia Minor, Cyprus, Libya or Egypt (Athens at that time lost a fleet aiding an Egyptian revolt against Persia).

Doubts about the existence 

Our knowledge of the Peace of Callias comes from references by the 4th century BC orators Isocrates and Demosthenes as well as the historian Diodorus. The ancient historian Theopompus deemed it a fabrication arguing that the inscription of the treaty was a fake – the lettering used hadn't come into practice until half a century after the treaty was purported to have been agreed. It is possible that the treaty never officially existed, and if it was concluded, its importance is disputed. Thucydides did not mention it, but Herodotus says something that may reasonably be construed as supporting its existence, as does Plutarch, who thought it had either been signed after the Battle of the Eurymedon in 466 BC, or that it had never been signed at all. In any case, there seems to have been some agreement reached ending hostilities with Persia after 450/449, which allowed Athens to deal with the new threats from the other Greek states such as Corinth and Thebes, as well as Euboea which rebelled from the Delian League shortly after this. These conflicts may have arisen when Athenian 'allies' felt there was no longer a justification for the Delian League (which had developed from the Spartan-led Hellenic League that defeated Xerxes' invasion), as Persia was apparently no longer a threat. As Athens demanded more and more tribute and exerted more political and economic control over its allies, the League became more of a true empire, and many of Athens' allies began to rebel. Although Callias was also responsible for a peace (the Thirty Years' Peace) with Sparta in 446–445 BC, the growing Athenian threat would eventually lead to the Peloponnesian War.

Fighting between the Greeks and the Persians subsided after 450, but Persia continued to meddle in Greek affairs and was to become instrumental in securing a Spartan victory in the Peloponnesian War. Nonetheless, it remains a controversial topic among historians and scholars today.

See also 
 List of treaties

Further reading 
 De Ste. Croix, G.E.M.,The Origins of the Peloponnesian War, London 1972 (especially the Appendices).
 Rhodes, P.J. The History of the Classical World 478–323 BC, 2005.
 Badian, E. “The Peace of Callias.” The Journal of Hellenic Studies 50 (1987): 1–39.
 Samons, Loren J. “Kimon, Kallias and Peace with Persia.” Historia: Zeitschrift für Alte Geschichte 47 (1998): 129–140.

References

449 BC
Treaties of the Achaemenid Empire
Treaties of Athens
Wars of the Delian League
5th-century BC treaties
Treaties of ancient Greece
Non-aggression pacts
Historical controversies